The men's 200 metre breaststroke event at the 1948 Olympic Games took place between 5 and 7 August at the Empire Pool. This swimming event used the breaststroke. Because an Olympic-size swimming pool is 50 metres long, this race consisted of four lengths of the pool.

John Davies' time was recorded by the timekeepers to be 0.2s faster than the bronze medallist Bob Sohl of the United States.  However, the judges believed that Sohl had touched first and awarded him the bronze.

Medalists

Results

Heats

Semifinals

Final

Key: OR = Olympic record

References

Men's breaststroke 200 metre
Men's events at the 1948 Summer Olympics